James Meechan (born 14 October 1963) was a Scottish footballer. He began his career in the junior ranks with Ayrshire side Irvine Meadow, before turning 'senior' and joining Dumbarton where he was a stalwart in the midfield for seven seasons.

References

1963 births
Scottish footballers
Dumbarton F.C. players
Scottish Football League players
Living people
Association football midfielders